William Hodge II (born August 28, 1982), better known as Willy Will, is an American Grammy award nominated record producer from Louisville, Kentucky. Willy Will began his career working with Static Major and Polow Da Don.  He produced three tracks on Lil Wayne's "Tha Carter IV": "Intro", "Interlude" and "Outro".  Willy Will has also worked with E-40, Rihanna, R. Kelly, Missy Elliott, Sean Garrett, OJ Da Juiceman, Rick Ross, Nas, Andre 3000, Busta Rhymes and Ice Cube.

Notable productions

References

External links
Official Blog

1982 births
Living people
Record producers from Kentucky
Musicians from Louisville, Kentucky